Lendamboi, Letemboi, or Small Nambas, is one of the Malekula Interior languages of Vanuatu.

External links 
 Materials on Karnai are included in the open access Arthur Capell collection (AC2) and the ASMPI collection held by Paradisec

References

Malekula languages
Languages of Vanuatu